Javier Ramírez may refer to:
 Javier Ramírez (cyclist)
 Javier Ramírez (entertainer)
 Javier Ramírez Sinués, Spanish politician and official